Empress Marie Feodorovna of Russia may refer to:

Sophie Marie Dorothea of Württemberg (1759-1828), consort of Emperor Paul
Maria Feodorovna (Dagmar of Denmark) (1847-1928), consort of Emperor Alexander III